The Night Horsemen is a surviving 1921 American silent Western film directed by Lynn Reynolds and starring Tom Mix. It was produced by William Fox and released by Fox Film Corporation. It was advertised as a sequel to the film The Untamed (1920), but the only actor reprising their role was Mix.

A print is preserved in the George Eastman House Motion Picture Collection.

Cast
 Tom Mix as Whistling Dan
 May Hopkins as Kate Cumberland
 Harry Lonsdale as Old Joe Cumberland
 Joseph Bennett as Dr. Byrne
 Sid Jordan as Buck Daniels
 Bert Sprotte as Mac Strann
 Cap Anderson as Jerry Strann
 Lon Poff as Haw Haw
 Charles K. French as Marshal

References

External links

 
 
 

1921 films
1921 Western (genre) films
Films directed by Lynn Reynolds
Fox Film films
American black-and-white films
Silent American Western (genre) films
1920s American films